On 9 March 2023, a mass shooting occurred at a Kingdom Hall of Jehovah’s Witnesses in the Alsterdorf quarter, Hamburg, Germany. The shooter, identified as Philipp Fusz, entered the building during a service and opened fire, killing six adults and an unborn child, and injuring eight others. Fusz, a former Jehovah's Witness, took his own life minutes later. He had no criminal record and was not a known extremist. Police received an anonymous letter indicating he was angry at Witnesses and his former employer, which may help them determine a motive.

Shooting 
On 9 March 2023, at around 9:00 p.m., a woman sitting in her car outside the Kingdom Hall on Deelbögestrasse was fired upon by a lone gunman wielding a Heckler & Koch P30 semi-automatic handgun. The woman escaped unharmed. The gunman then proceeded to fire 10 more rounds through a window of the hall before entering. 36 people were physically attending a service at the time of the shooting, while others were watching online. The gunman fired a total of 135 rounds.

Police responded to emergency calls and arrived at the scene at 9:08. A specialized armed unit from the Alsterdorf police station that was in the area at the time also arrived and forced entry into the three-story building at 9:09. They encountered the gunman and pursued him upstairs, where he subsequently took his own life.

A neighbor captured some footage of the shooting, which shows an individual entering the building through a window, followed by gunshots. The figure then exits the building and is seen in the courtyard before firing more shots through a first-floor window. After the shots are fired, the lights are turned off.

Casualties 
Four men and two women, aged 33 to 60, as well as an unborn baby, were killed. Eight people were injured, four critically. The injured include the baby's mother, who was seven months pregnant. The dead were Germans and the injured are six Germans, one Ugandan and one Ukrainian.

Perpetrator  
The suspect was later identified as Philipp Fusz, a single man aged 35. On his website, Fusz described himself as a business consultant who grew up in a "strict evangelical household" in Kempten, Bavaria. He was a former member of the Jehovah's Witnesses, had no criminal record, and was not known as an extremist. In 2022, he self-published a book called The Truth About God, Jesus Christ and Satan: A New Reflected View of Epochal Dimensions. In it, he claims to have had prophetic dreams, to have visited hell for three years and to have had an "angelic audience" and "angelic fans". It interpreted the Russian invasion of Ukraine as God's cleansing of Ukrainian sex workers.

Fusz held a gun permit and permission to keep his P30. In January 2023, police had received an anonymous letter saying he had "particular anger against religious members or against the Jehovah’s Witnesses and his former employer", but after interviewing him on 7 February, found no legal reason to cancel the permit or confiscate the gun.

According to Arnold Keller, the spokesperson for the Hamburg prosecutor's office, considering the past history of Philipp F. and the Jehovah's Witnesses, it is not possible to completely rule out the possibility that the perpetrator acted out of animosity towards this particular community. However, it is unclear if this was the definitive motive for the crime. On the other hand, a political reason has been ruled out by officials.

See also 
Hanau shootings
List of mass shootings in Germany

References 

2023 mass shootings in Europe
2023 murders in Germany
2023 suicides
2020s in Hamburg
21st-century mass murder in Germany
Attacks on buildings and structures in 2023
Attacks on buildings and structures in Germany
Attacks on churches in Europe
Hamburg-Nord
Infanticide
March 2023 crimes in Europe
March 2023 events in Germany
Mass murder in 2023
Mass shootings in Germany
Murder in Hamburg
Murder–suicides in Germany
Persecution of Jehovah's Witnesses